Gaudí is a crater on Mercury. Its name was adopted by the International Astronomical Union in 2012, after the Spanish Catalan architect Antoni Gaudí.

The crater is within Borealis Planitia.  The larger crater Stieglitz is due south of Gaudí.

References

Impact craters on Mercury